János Toldi (born 22 January 1928) is a Hungarian sprint canoer who competed in the late 1940s. He was eliminated in the heats of the K-1 1000 m event at the 1948 Summer Olympics in London.

References
János Toldi's profile at Sports Reference.com

1928 births
Living people
Canoeists at the 1948 Summer Olympics
Hungarian male canoeists
Olympic canoeists of Hungary
Place of birth missing (living people)
20th-century Hungarian people